Kelton may refer to:

Places
England

 Kelton, a location in Mickleton parish, County Durham

Scotland
Kelton, a parish in Kirkcudbrightshire; see Castle Douglas

United States
Kelton, Pennsylvania, an unincorporated community
Kelton, Texas, an unincorporated community
Kelton, Utah, a ghost town

People 
Kelton (surname)
Kelton Flinn, American computer game designer, founder of Kesmai
Kelton B. Miller (1860–1941), American journalist and politician
Kelton Pell, Aboriginal Australian stage, TV and film actor
Kelton Winston (1939– 1980), American football defensive back
Fred Kelton Gage (1902-1951), American lawyerv and politician

Other uses
Kelton station, former station in Dormont, Pennsylvania
Roy "Jawjack" Kelton, a character from the 1988 movie 14 Going on 30

See also
Kelton House (disambiguation)